Notaris is a genus of marsh weevils in the family of beetles known as Brachyceridae. There are at least 40 described species in Notaris.

Species
These 40 species belong to the genus Notaris:

 Notaris acridulus (Linnaeus, C., 1758) c g
 Notaris aethiops (Fabricius, 1792) i c b
 Notaris alpinus Helfer, c
 Notaris aterrima (Hampe, 1850) g
 Notaris bimaculatus (Fabricius, 1787) i c
 Notaris cordicollis Stierl., 1893-1894 c
 Notaris dalmatinus Stierlin, 1892 c
 Notaris dauricus Faust, 1882 c
 Notaris discretus Faust, 1882 c
 Notaris distans Faust, 1890 c
 Notaris dorsalis Germar, 1817 c
 Notaris eversmanni Faust, 1882 c
 Notaris festucae Billberg, 1820 c
 Notaris flavipilosus Chittenden, 1930 i c
 Notaris frivaldszkyi Tournier, 1874 c
 Notaris funebris Kono, 1930 c
 Notaris gerhardti Letzner, 1872 c
 Notaris goliath Buchanan, 1927 i c
 Notaris granulipennis Tournier, 1874 c
 Notaris illibatus Faust, 1882 c
 Notaris imprudens Faust, 1885 c
 Notaris indigena Billberg, 1820 c
 Notaris insularis Faust, 1882 c
 Notaris lapponicus Faust, 1882 c
 Notaris lederi Faust, 1882 c
 Notaris mandschuricus Voss, 1940 c
 Notaris montanus Faust, 1882 c
 Notaris nereis Billberg, 1820 c
 Notaris nivalis Faust, 1882 c
 Notaris oberti Faust, 1885 c
 Notaris ochoticus Korotyaev, 1984 c
 Notaris okunii Kono, 1930 c
 Notaris petax Faust, 1882 c
 Notaris puncticollis (LeConte, 1876) i b
 Notaris punctum Billberg, 1820 c
 Notaris rotundicollis Motschulsky, 1860 c
 Notaris salarius Schneider, 1898 c
 Notaris scirpi (Fabricius, J.C., 1792) c g
 Notaris subcostatus Kono, 1930 c
 Notaris wyomiensis Chittendon, 1906 c

Data sources: i = ITIS, c = Catalogue of Life, g = GBIF, b = Bugguide.net

References

Further reading

External links

 

Brachyceridae
Articles created by Qbugbot